AB-005 or [1-[(1-methylpiperidin-2-yl)methyl]-1H-indol-3-yl](2,2,3,3-tetramethylcyclopropyl)-methanone is a designer drug offered by online vendors as a cannabimimetic agent. The structure and pharmacological activity of AB-005 was published in 2010, prior to its commercial availability in 2012, where it was reported to have high affinity for both CB1 (Ki = 5.5 nM) and CB2 receptors (Ki = 0.48 nM). AB-005 features groups found in other previously reported synthetic cannabinoids: the tetramethylcyclopropane group of UR-144 and XLR-11 as well as the (1-methyl-2-piperidinyl)methyl substituent of AM-1248 and AM-1220. No information regarding the in vivo activity of AB-005 has been published, and only anecdotal reports are known of its psychoactivity in humans.

Legal status
In 2013, psychoactive products in New Zealand containing this drug were given interim approval under psychoactive substances legislation.

See also 
 A-834,735
 AB-001
 JWH-018
 FUB-144

References 

Cannabinoids
Designer drugs
Tetramethylcyclopropanoylindoles
Piperidines